Vexillum beverlyae is a species of small sea snail, marine gastropod mollusk in the family Costellariidae, the ribbed miters.

Description
The length of the shell attains 31 mm, its diameter 9.24 mm.

Distribution
This marine species occurs off the Solomon Islands.

References

Externa links
 Turner, H.; Salisbury, R. A. (1999). Three new costellariid species from Japan, Papua New Guinea and other Indo-Pacific locations. Apex. 14 (3-4): 73-80

beverlyae
Gastropods described in 1999